Jammin' was a musical comedy show on BBC Radio 2 in the United Kingdom. It was presented by Rowland Rivron, who also plays drums. In addition to Rowland, there were two regulars in the band, and two guests - usually one comedian and one musician. The two regulars were usually Dave Catlin-Birch and Steve Brown. When Dave Catlin-Birch is on tour, he was usually replaced by Honka James Roby. Brown replaced original regular Richard Vranch in 2003.

Thus the show usually followed the format:
Introduction Song in which the regulars and guests are introduced.
Short interview with the guests, usually playing a snippet from one of their hits or a performance of the first song they ever wrote. This usually turns into an innuendo, and the performance is stopped by Rivron just before it becomes too explicit.
Feature from one of the regulars (ABBA/Beatles backwards / "Two Songs for the Price of One" / "Beatles per Minute").
Bass Line: the bassist plays a bass line, and the other member of the band (except Rivron) try to guess from which song it comes.
Mixing Styles: One guest suggests a musical style, and other a singer/band, and styles are combined, e.g. 'Roll with It' by Oasis in the style of Jerry Lee Lewis. The roles are then reversed, with the other guest performing.
Party Pieces Guests will perform their musical party piece, or they have to sing one of their well-known songs inserting words suggested by the rest of the band.
Audience: Members of the audience call out different words and the band have to try to think of songs that include the word, and play a sample of that song.
Concluding jam drawn from the last of the songs played from the feature above, or in earlier series, "they song we enjoyed playing most today", which could any song performed during the show.
The programme is punctuated by snippets from a song sung in varying styles (e.g. a cappella, Country and Western, Bob Dylan-esque) as announced at the end of the programme "Jammin' was brought to you in association with...." However, the Autumn 2006 series did not include this information.

Regulars 
Rowland Rivron - host and drummer
Richard Vranch - keyboards and guitars
Dave Catlin-Birch - guitar
Mitch Benn - bass and guitar
Steve Brown - piano and occasionally guitar
Guy Pratt - bass guitar

Guests 

Ade Edmondson
Edwyn Collins
Hils Barker
Kate Robbins
Barbara Dickson
Christian Reilly
Kim Wilde
Phil Nichol (of Corky and the Juice Pigs)
Miles Hunt (of The Wonder Stuff)
Mike Peters (of The Alarm)
Mike Edwards (of Jesus Jones)
Kevin Eldon
Justin Edwards
Jim Diamond
James Robert Morrison
Robert Newman
Boothby Graffoe
Nick Heyward (of Haircut One Hundred)
Melanie C
Mark King (of Level 42)
Neil Innes
Jools Holland
Steve Punt
Ronnie Golden
Neil Hannon
Phill Jupitus
Chas & Dave
Rainer Hirsch
Mike Batt
Rod Argent
Hugh Laurie
Fish
Beverley Knight
Tim Vine
Tony Hawks
Rob Deering
Thomas Dolby
Nik Kershaw
Rich Hall
Chris Difford
Glenn Tilbrook
Jackie Clune
Leo Sayer

Writers 
 Robin Ince
 Kevin Day

External links
 

BBC Radio comedy programmes
BBC Radio 2 programmes
2001 radio programme debuts